Scopula herbuloti is a moth of the  family Geometridae. It is found in Equatorial Guinea (Bioko).

Subspecies
Scopula herbuloti is a junior secondary homonym of Antitrygodes herbuloti described by Viette in 1977 and requires a replacement name.

References

Moths described in 2001
herbuloti Karisch, 2001
Moths of Africa